Jacob Kjeldgaard (4 September 1884 in Copenhagen – 6 February 1964 in Paris) was a Danish photographer and journalist active in France. Most well known by his pseudonym "Marinus," he created satirical photomontages for the  French periodical Marianne (magazine: 1932-40), works similar to those of John Heartfield.

Biography 
He was the fifth child of a Danish master craftsman; after grade school he attended a polytechnical school. He wanted to be an artist and attended art school for several years before working with his family to create electric lighted signs for businesses. He emigrated in 1909 to Paris.

Photomontages 
His photomontages were inspired by classical masterpieces and by the cinema. His most important works were pacifist political montages against Hitler and Stalin. Because he created work under the pseudonym "Marinus," Kjeldgaard survived the German occupation of France without drawing suspicion that he was a political agitator.

One of his works published in J'ai Vu on October 20, 1917, showed the American ambassador to Germany and Frenchman Bolo Pasha in conversation, implicating the two in treasonous activity and collaboration with the Germans. The montage was so convincing that Marinus was called into court to testify that he had created the artwork and thus it was not usable as evidence.

Posthumous legacy 
His work has been rediscovered in recent years, initially through a 2007 exhibition titled "Marinus and Marianne" at the art museum in Aalborg, Denmark. The Museum Ludwig in Cologne held an retrospective exhibition of Marinus and Heartfield in 2008.

See also

 Marianne (magazine: 1932-40)
 Photomontage

References

Further reading 
 Marinus et Marianne. Photomontages satiriques 1932-1940. Editions Alternatives, Paris 2008, ISBN 978-286227-571-0

1884 births

1964 deaths
20th-century Danish journalists
Danish photojournalists
Danish photographers
Danish emigrants to France